The Bushveld horseshoe bat (Rhinolophus simulator) is a species of bat in the family Rhinolophidae. It is found in Botswana, Cameroon, Ivory Coast, Eswatini, Ethiopia, Guinea, Kenya, Liberia, Malawi, Mozambique, Nigeria, South Africa, South Sudan, Tanzania, Zambia, and Zimbabwe. Its natural habitats are moist savanna, caves and other subterranean habitats.

References

Rhinolophidae
Bats of Africa
Mammals of Botswana
Mammals of Cameroon
Mammals of West Africa
Mammals of Ethiopia
Mammals of Kenya
Mammals of Malawi
Mammals of Mozambique
Mammals of South Africa
Mammals of South Sudan
Mammals of Eswatini
Mammals of Tanzania
Mammals of Zambia
Mammals of Zimbabwe
Mammals described in 1904
Taxa named by Knud Andersen
Taxonomy articles created by Polbot